Krégbé is a town in east-central Ivory Coast. It is a sub-prefecture of Arrah Department in Moronou Region, Lacs District.

Krégbé was a commune until March 2012, when it became one of 1126 communes nationwide that were abolished.

In 2014, the population of the sub-prefecture of Krégbé was 21,299.

Villages
The 6 villages of the sub-prefecture of Krégbé and their population in 2014 are:
 Assalé-Kouassikro (7 082)
 Assouakro (2 465)
 Erobo (3 830)
 Gouabo (655)
 Krégbé (6 278)
 Midakro (989)

References

Sub-prefectures of Moronou Region
Former communes of Ivory Coast